The 4th Maneuver Enhancement Brigade (4th MEB) was a United States Army brigade located at Fort Leonard Wood, Missouri, subordinate to the 1st Infantry Division since its activation on 16 October 2008. The 4th MEB was one of three active duty Maneuver Enhancement Brigades. The Brigade was tasked to improve the movement capabilities and rear area security for commanders at division level or higher. This was the only brigade in Fort Leonard Wood that is part of FORSCOM.  The 4th Maneuver Enhancement Brigade inactivated on 17 June 2015.

The 4th MEB was composed of:
 Headquarters & Headquarters Company
  5th Engineer Battalion
  92nd Military Police Battalion
  94th Engineer Battalion
  193rd Brigade Support Battalion
 94th Signal Company

External links 
 Official homepage

References 

4 004
Military units and formations established in 2008
Military units and formations disestablished in 2015